Kibet is a (surname or middle name)of Kenyan origin that may refer to a male born during the day. 

David Kibet (born 1963), Kenyan middle-distance runner and former Kenyan record holder
Duncan Kibet (born 1978), Kenyan marathon runner and 2009 Rotterdam Marathon winner
Eliud Kibet Kirui (born 1975), Kenyan cross country runner
Hilda Kibet (born 1981), Kenyan long-distance runner representing the Netherlands
John Kibet Koech (born 1995), Kenyan-born long-distance runner who competes internationally for Bahrain
Luke Kibet (born 1983), Kenyan marathon runner and 2007 world champion
Moses Kibet (born 1991), Ugandan middle- and long-distance runner
Raymond Kibet (born 1996), Kenyan sprinter
Sammy Kibet Rotich (born 1980), Kenyan marathon runner
Shedrack Kibet Korir (born 1978), Kenyan middle-distance runner and 2007 World Championships medallist
Stephen Kosgei Kibet (born 1986), Kenyan half marathon runner
Sylvia Jebiwott Kibet (born 1984), Kenyan 5000 metres runner and two-time World Championships medallist
Wilfred Kibet Kigen (born 1975), Kenyan marathon runner and three-time Frankfurt Marathon winner
Yusuf Kibet Biwott (born 1986), Kenyan 3000 metres runner

See also
Bett (disambiguation), name origin of Kibet from Kip (meaning "son of") + Bet
Kibet language, a Maban language of Chad

Kalenjin names